Shame is a 2009 compilation album of various earlier albums, EPs, and singles by the Sacramento hardcore punk band Trash Talk released specifically for release in United Kingdom. It collates onto two discs their 2006 debut full-length Walking Disease, their 2007 Plagues EP, their eponymous 2008 sophomore full-length, and their 2009 East of Eden single, featuring Keith Morris of The Circle Jerks and formerly Black Flag.

Track listing
All songs written by Trash Talk. Disc One: tracks 1-11 from Walking Disease, tracks 12-17 from Plagues. Disc Two: Tracks 1-12 from Trash Talk, track 13 from East of Eden.

Disc One - Walking Disease and Plagues
 "F.Y.R.A" - 1:05
 "Worthless Nights" - 1:02
 "Walking Disease" - 0:40
 "Pushed Aside" - 0:52
 "Luck" - 0:33
 "Destroy" - 0:51
 "Run Don't Walk" - 0:12
 "Dead End Road" - 0:45
 "Sacramento Is Dead" - 1:10
 "Just Die" - 0:14
 "Pain in Vain" - 1:47
 "Scatter" - 0:50
 "Babylon, CA" - 0:44
 "Flood" - 0:36
 "Manifest Destination" - 1:09
 "Lepers to Feed the Lepers" - 0:29
 "Kill the Snakes" - 1:29

Disc Two - Trash Talk and East of Eden
 "The Hand That Feeds" - 1:41
 "Well of Souls" - 0:25
 "Birth Plague Die" - 1:27
 "Incarnate" - 0:18
 "I Block" - 1:26
 "Dig" - 0:48
 "Onward and Upward" - 1:38
 "Immaculate Infection" - 0:34
 "Shame" - 0:52
 "All the King's Men" - 0:24
 "The Mistake" - 0:09
 "Revelation" - 4:30
 "East of Eden/Son of a Bitch" - 2:29

Personnel
Vocals - Lee Spielman
Guitar - Garrett Stevenson
Bass guitar, vocals - Spencer Pollard
Drums - Sam Bosson
Additional vocals on Track 30 by Keith Morris
Tracks 1-17 recorded by Zack Ohren
Tracks 18-29 recorded by Steve Albini
Track 30 recorded by Manny Nieto and Eddie Rivas

References

2009 compilation albums
Trash Talk (band) albums